Sempervivum pittonii, called the Pittoni houseleek, is a species of flowering plant in the genus Sempervivum, native to the eastern Alps of Austria. It is a local endemic of two mountains in Styria, where it occurs exclusively on serpentine rock. A perennial, cold hardy, rosette-forming succulent, it has gained the Royal Horticultural Society's Award of Garden Merit.

References

pittonii
Endemic flora of Austria
Plants described in 1854